Riihimäki railway station is a railway station located in the town of Riihimäki, Finland.

History
The Riihimäki railway station is one of the original stations on the main railway track from Helsinki to Hämeenlinna, opened in 1862 (see Finnish Main Line and Helsinki–Riihimäki railway). The town was originally built because of the railway. In 1870, a track to Saint Petersburg, Russia, was built (see Riihimäki–Saint Petersburg Railway). The amount of traffic increased, and by the 20th century, Riihimäki became an important crossing-point station. In 1907, a narrow track to Loppi was built, but it was discontinued in 1952. The track was electrified in 1972. By the late 20th century, the railroad traffic from Riihimäki south towards Helsinki started to become overloaded, so a more direct track to Lahti was built. When it was completed, the long-distance rail traffic eastwards toward Russia switched to this new track. Now only local trains and cargo trains travel between Riihimäki and Lahti.

The Riihimäki railway station is currently under renovation work during which the platforms are raised and the platform shelters, lifts and the station lights are renewed.

Train connections
Helsinki commuter rail:
 R-line trains (Helsinki-Riihimäki-Tampere)
D-line trains (Helsinki-Riihimäki)
T-line trains (Helsinki-Riihimäki, nighttime)
G-line trains (Riihimäki-Lahti)

Long-distance:
 InterCity and Pendolino trains (Helsinki-Tampere, Helsinki-Pori, Helsinki-Jyväskylä-Pieksämäki)
 Overnight trains to Lapland (Helsinki-Kolari, Helsinki-Rovaniemi-Kemijärvi)

Departure tracks 
There are eleven tracks at the Riihimäki railway station of which six (1, 4, 5, 7, 8, 11) have platforms for passenger trains.

 Track 1 is used by southbound long-distance trains and some of the commuter trains (R, T) to Helsinki.
 Track 4 is used by northbound long-distance trains and a couple of R-line commuter trains to Tampere.
 Track 5 is used by commuter trains to Helsinki (D, R, T) and to Tampere (R).
 Track 7 is used by some few commuter trains to Helsinki (R, D) and to Lahti (G).
 Track 8 is used only by G-line commuter trains to Lahti.
 Track 11 is a temporary platform track used mostly by the G-line commuter trains during the station renovation.

References

External links

Railway station
Railway stations in Kanta-Häme
Railway stations opened in 1862
1862 establishments in Finland